North Berwick railway station is a railway station serving the seaside town of North Berwick in East Lothian, Scotland.

History 

Albert Edward, Prince of Wales (the future King Edward VII) visited North Berwick in 1859, arriving by train. By this time the town was increasingly favoured as a resort for the wealthy, and the royal visit helped to boost its popularity. To encourage tourism, a large new hotel (the 'Royal Hotel') was built opposite the station, with the railway company being a shareholder in this venture until 1923. The growth of the town during the Victorian era resulted in increased business for the railway, and in 1894 the station was enlarged to cope with the traffic.

Following the rebuilding, the station complex featured two terminus platforms, which extended right up to Station Road. To the south of the station was a goods yard with ten sidings and a goods shed.  One of the sidings originally extended across Station Road onto a high embankment between Abbey Road and Station Hill in order to serve the gasworks at the foot of Station Hill (this embankment was the only part of the harbour line to be completed).

A two-road dead-ended engine shed was located on the north of the line, with its back against the Ware Road overbridge, while the signalbox was located on the south side of the line opposite the shed. West of Ware Road was a headshunt siding on the north side of the line. In 1904 a replacement gasworks was built at Ferrygate, with two sidings on the north side of the line facing towards North Berwick.

Two camping coaches were positioned here by the Scottish Region from 1960 to 1966, the coaches were Pullman camping coaches from 1961 to 1965.

In the days of steam locomotives many of the North Berwick branch passenger trains terminated at Drem, and passengers had to change onto main line stopping services to continue their journeys.

Dieselisation

In 1958, diesel multiple units were introduced on the North Berwick services, and most branch trains then ran right through to Edinburgh Waverley or Corstorphine. With the arrival of the diesels, the engine shed was closed.

Despite the improvement to passenger services upon dieselisation, a period of decline had already begun.  The intermediate station at Dirleton had closed to passengers on 1 February 1954, and its use for goods traffic ended on 1 June 1959. Nationally, the railways were suffering as a result of increased car ownership and competition from road haulage. The gasworks, formerly a major customer, ceased to receive coal deliveries in the 1960s, and North Berwick goods yard closed on 1 January 1968. The signalbox closed one week later, at which time all tracks were removed except that leading to the secondary (north) platform. The late '60s were the period of the infamous 'Beeching Axe', and British Rail sought permission to close the branch line altogether, along with all local stations east of Edinburgh. Although the Minister of Transport refused permission for these closures, a drastic cut in service was implemented. When the new timetable was introduced on 4 January 1970, the weekday service consisted of just two morning and two evening peak hour trains. This period represented the nadir of the station's fortunes, with a skeleton service and most of the station complex derelict.

Threat of railway closure

The passenger service gradually recovered, despite a further threat to the station's future following publication of the Serpell Report in 1982. However, in 1985 the grand but decaying station buildings were demolished and the remaining platform was shortened. A new station car park was built on the site of the old station buildings and platforms, while the goods yard site was sold for housing development. The 'new' station was unstaffed, and 'pay trains' were introduced between Edinburgh and North Berwick on 27 May 1985. Although the loss of the old station buildings was lamented by many local people, the reduction in operating costs and the provision of a park-and-ride car park contributed to the revitalisation of the line. By the end of the 1980s the service was once again operating on an hourly frequency.

Electrification of the branch
Electrification of the branch line in the early 1990s by British Rail in tandem with 25 kV AC electrification of the East Coast Main Line showed a renewed confidence in the long-term future of the station. Regular electric service began on 8 July 1991, and passenger numbers have continued to grow steadily. A passenger-operated self-service ticket machine was installed in the late 2000s.

Services 

Train services are provided by ScotRail; services operated on a regular hourly frequency on weekdays, with additional peak hour services and Saturdays saw a half-hourly daytime service, with Saturday evening and Sunday service being hourly. As of 2022, the service provision is much the same however Saturday services currently run hourly.

Rolling stock

References

Notes

Sources 

 
 Hajducki, Andrew M. (1992) The North Berwick and Gullane Branch Lines, Headington, Oakwood Press,

External links
 Video footage and narration on North Berwick station
 RAILSCOT on the North Berwick Branch
 RAILSCOT on Aberlady, Gullane and North Berwick Railway

Buildings and structures demolished in 1985
Railway stations in East Lothian
Former North British Railway stations
Railway stations in Great Britain opened in 1850
Railway stations served by ScotRail
North Berwick